Annapurna (born Umamaheswari; 17 October 1948), also credited as Annapurnamma, is an Indian actress who appears primarily in Telugu films. She is known for her portrayal as mother, mother-in-law, and grand mother, aunt, etc. She started her film career as an actor alongside Mohan Babu (debut film) in the blockbuster Telugu film Swargam Narakam directed by Dasari Narayana Rao in 1975. She appeared in over 700 films and won three Nandi Awards.

Early life 
Annapurna was born as Umamaheswari on 17 October 1948 in Vijayawada, Andhra Pradesh to Prasad Rao and Sitaravamma. Though she was initially credited as Uma, lyricist C. Narayana Reddy changed it when she did Dasari Narayana Rao-directed Swargam Narakam.

Career 
Annapurna has started her film career in 1975. She is well remembered for her character roles in Samsaram Oka Chadarangam, Muthyamantha Muddu, Swargam Narakam, Assembly Rowdy and acted in almost all of the 1980s movies with Chiranjeevi as lead hero namely Donga, Chattamtho Porattam, Sangarshana, Raakshashudu, Trinetrudu, Marana Mrudangam, Khaidi No 786, and Jwala.

She has also acted in Tamil film such as Nadodi Pattukkaran, and Varavu Nalla Uravu etc. and in Hindi movies such as Waqt Ka Shahenshah, and Kanoon Ki Hathkadee. With the absence from the screen for few years, she started her second innings in 2007 with the Telugu films Evadithe Nakenti and Godava as mother and grand mother respectively.

Annapurna who played the role of lead actress in Swargam Narakam alongside Mohan Babu, also played the role of mother to Mohan Babu in Assembly Rowdy (1991). She went on to appear in over 700 to 800 films.

Personal life 
Annapurna had a daughter, Keerthi, who died by suicide in June 2018.

Filmography

List of films appeared:

Telugu

 Swargam Narakam (1975)
 Secretary (1976)
 Subhodhayam (1980)
 Mondi Ghatam (1982)
 Manchu Pallaki (1982)
 Intlo Ramayya Veedhilo Krishnayya (1982)
  Anuraga Dewatha  ( 1982)
 Mundadugu (1983)
 Chanda Sasanudu (1983)
 Bobbili Brahmanna (1983) as Susheela
 Pelli Choopulu (1983)
 Aalaya Sikharam (1983)
 Maga Maharaju (1983)
 Sivudu Sivudu Sivudu (1983)
 Sangarshana (1983)
 Manishiko Charithra (1984)
 Illalu Priyuralu (1984)
 Bava Maradallu (1984)
 Goonda (1984)
 Naagu (1984)
 Devanthakudu (1984)
 Inti Guttu (1984)
 Rustum (1984)
 Jackie (1985)
 Devalayam (1985)
 Chattamtho Poratam (1985)
 Donga (1985)
 Agni Parvatam (1985)
 Chiranjeevi (1985)
 Jwala (1985)
 Bharyabhartala Bandham (1985)
 Puli (1985)
 Shrimati Garu (1985)
 Raktha Sindhuram (1985)
 Oka Radha Iddaru Krishnulu (1985)
 Rakshasudu (1986)
 Jayam Manade (1986) as Rajeshwari
 Anasuyamma Gari Alludu (1986)
 Kirathakudu (1986)
 Aranyakanda (1986)
 Chanakya Shapadham (1986)
 Samsaram Oka Chadarangam (1987)
  Inti Donga  (1987)
 Bhargava Ramudu (1987)
 Makutamleni Maharaju (1987)
 Ajeyudu (1987)
 Bhale Mogudu (1987)
 Jebu Donga (1987)
 Ramudu Bheemudu (1988)
 Ontari Poratam (1989)
 Bandhuvulostunnaru Jagratha (1989)
 Muthyamantha Muddu (1989)
 Varavu Nalla Uravu (1990)
 Raja Vikramarka (1990)
 Appula Appa Rao (1991)
 Stuartpuram Police Station (1991)
 Assembly Rowdy (1991)
 Aditya 369 (1991)
 Kadapa Reddemma(1991)
 Pachchani Samsaram (1992)
 Hello Darling (1992)
 Nadodi Pattukkaran (1992)
 Rowdy Inspector (1992)
 Allari Mogudu (1992)
 President Gari Pellam (1992)
 Prana Daata (1993)
 Mechanic Alludu (1993)
 Kannayya Kittayya (1993)
 Gaayam (1993)
 Bangaru Bullodu (1993)
 Govinda Govinda (1994)
 Shubha Lagnam (1994)
 Hello Brother (1994)
 Hero (1994)
 Brahmachari Mogudu (1994)
 Muddula Priyudu (1994)
 Vamsanikokkadu (1996)
 Pavithra Bandham (1996)
 Sindhooram (1997)
 Pelli Chesukundam (1997)
 Muddula Mogudu (1997)
 Peddannayya (1997)
 Devudu (1997)
 Bavagaru Bagunnara (1998)
 Rana (1998 film) (1998)
 Pandaga (1998)
 Pavitra Prema (1998)
 Prema Katha (1999)
 Sulthan (1999)
 Raja (1999)
 Anaganaga Oka Ammai (1999)
 Nuvve Kavali (2000)
 Kalisundam Raa (2000)
 Kouravudu (2000)
 Tiladaanam (2001)
 Ammo Bomma (2001)
 Murari (2001)
 Seema Simham (2002)
 Premaku Swagatam (2002)
 Tappu Chesi Pappu Koodu (2002)
 Aa Naluguru (2004)
 Kanchanamala Cable TV (2005)
 Evadaithe Nakenti (2007)
 Godava (2007)
 Arundhati (2009)
 Pistha (2009)
 Manasara (2010)
 Panchakshari (2010)
 Krishnam Vande Jagadgurum (2012)
 Gundello Godari (2013 )
 Doosukeltha (2013)
  Band Balu (2013)
 Emo Gurram Egaravachu (2014)
 Avatharam (2014)
 Oka Laila Kosam (2014)
 Drushyam (2014)
 Krishna Gaadi Veera Prema Gaadha (2016)
 Sarrainodu (2016)
 A Aa (2016)
 Ekkadiki Pothavu Chinnavada (2016)
 Goutham Nanda (2017)
 Rarandoi Veduka Chudham (2017)
 Raju Gari Gadhi 2 (2017)
 Raja The Great (2017)
 Malli Raava (2017)
 Touch Chesi Chudu (2018)
 Nela Ticket(2018)
 Saakshyam (2018)
 Happy Wedding (2018)
 Srinivasa Kalyanam (2018)
 Geetha Govindam (2018)
 Paper Boy (2018)
 F2 - Fun and Frustration (2019)
  Where Is the Venkatalakshmi (2019)
 Maharshi (2019)
 Gaddalakonda Ganesh (2019)
 Tenali Ramakrishna BA. BL (2019)
 Entha Manchivaadavuraa (2020)
 Disco Raja (2020)
 Orey Bujjiga (2020)
 Amaram Akhilam Prema (2020)
 Annapurnamma Gari Manavadu (2020)
 Lalijo Lalijo (2021)
 Cycle (2021)
 Zombie Reddy (2021)
 Thank You Brother (2021)
 Konda Polam (2021)
 Drushyam 2 (2021)
 F3 (2022)
 Gangstar Gangaraju (2022)
 Pellikuturu Party (2022)
 Sita Ramam (2022)
 Veera Simha Reddy(2022)

Tamil
 Vaathiyaar Veettu Pillai (1989)
 Varavu Nalla Uravu (1990)
 Nadodi Pattukkaran (1992)
 Meendum Savithri (1996)
  Jolly (1998)
 Hey Ram (2000)

Kannada
 Rowdy & MLA (1991)
 Shanti Kranti(1991)  
 Edurmaneli Ganda Pakkadmaneli Hendthi (1992)     
 Gadibidi Ganda (1993)

Malayalam
Kottayam (2020)

Hindi 
 Hum Hain Khalnayak (1996)
 Hey Ram (2000)

Awards
Nandi Awards
 Best Supporting Actress – Manishiko Charitra (1982)
 Special Jury Award – Dabbu Bhale Jabbu (1992)
 Best Character Actress – Maa Inti Aadapaduchu (1996)

References

External links
 

Indian film actresses
Living people
Actresses in Telugu cinema
1948 births
Actresses in Malayalam cinema
Actresses in Tamil cinema
Telugu actresses
Actresses from Vijayawada
Actresses from Andhra Pradesh
People from Krishna district
20th-century Indian actresses
21st-century Indian actresses
Nandi Award winners